James Edmund Byng (born 27 June 1969) is a British publisher. He works for the independent publishing firm Canongate Books, where he is the CEO and publisher.

Early life 

Byng grew up in the village of Abbots Worthy in Hampshire, England. The second son of the 8th Earl of Strafford and Jennifer May, he is brother to the author Lady Georgia Byng, and through his stepfather, Sir Christopher Bland (the former chairman of the BBC, British Telecom and Royal Shakespeare Company), he is the half-brother of Archie Bland, print journalist and former deputy editor of The Independent.

Education and family 

Byng was educated at Winchester College, an independent boarding-school for boys in the cathedral city of Winchester in Hampshire, Southern England, followed by the University of Edinburgh. While attending the university, he ran a funk, reggae, and rare groove night club named "Chocolate City" (after the Parliament classic) at The Venue with his first wife, Whitney McVeigh, with whom he has two children – a daughter Marley and son Leo. Whitney McVeigh is the daughter of a socialite mother and her father is an American banker. Byng and McVeigh separated in 2001, and in 2005 Byng married literary agent Elizabeth Sheinkman, with whom he has two children, Ivy and Nathaniel. Byng separated from Sheinkman in 2016 and married Silvia Gimenez Varela in 2021 and they have one child.

Publishing career 

After graduating, he convinced Scottish publisher Stephanie Wolfe Murray to give him a job at Canongate, then a respected but still somewhat marginalised Scottish company founded in 1973, which he joined as an intern. When Canongate was on the verge of bankruptcy in 1994, Byng, then in his mid-20s, instigated a buyout, aided by his business partner Hugh Andrew, his stepfather (former BBC chairman Sir Christopher Bland) and then father-in-law (co-chairman of the multinational investment bank Salomon Smith Barney). His first move in overhauling the company's image was to establish the ultra-hip Payback and Rebel Inc imprints, dedicated to championing cult authors. The Pocket Canons (1998) published in partnership with Matthew Darby was Byng's first runaway success: selected books from the Bible individually packaged with new introductions by the Dalai Lama among others. In the wake of the two-million selling, Booker-winning Life of Pi (2001), Canongate won Publisher of the Year at the British Book Awards in 2003, reportedly posting pre-tax profits of more than £1 million for that year.

Byng is the initiator and chair of World Book Night, an event in which on 5 March 2011 (following World Book Day on 3 March) one million books – 40,000 copies of each of 25 carefully selected titles – were given away to members of the public in the UK and Ireland. It entailed 20,000 "givers" each distributing 48 copies of their chosen title to whomever they chose.

References

External links
 Sam Leith, "The Tao of Mr Jamie Byng" (interview), Mr Porter, 22 February 2018.
 "The SRB Interview: Jamie Byng", Scottish Review of Books, 2 March 2012.
 "Porter Anderson meets Jamie Byng", The Bookseller, 29 May 2014.
 Vicky Allan, "Canongate's Jamie Byng balances the books for 21 years", The Herald, 19 September 2015.

1969 births
Living people
Alumni of the University of Edinburgh
People educated at Winchester College
Businesspeople from Winchester
Scottish book publishers (people)